Milan Zachariáš (born 1 October 1983) is a Czech football defender who plays for FK Ústí nad Labem in the Czech 2. Liga. He represented his country at youth international level.

References

External links 
 

1983 births
Living people
Czech footballers
Czech Republic youth international footballers
Czech Republic under-21 international footballers
Czech First League players
Association football defenders
FK Chmel Blšany players
SK Slavia Prague players
FK Ústí nad Labem players